Robert Michael Sigurðsson (born 18 October 1993) is an American-born Icelandic ice hockey player and a former member of the Icelandic men's national team. In 2017, he was named the Icelandic Men's Ice Hockey Player of the Year.

Playing career
Sigurðsson joined Skautafélag Reykjavíkur (SR) of the Icelandic Men's Hockey League during the 2011–12 season. He helped SR to the IHL finals where they lost to Skautafélagið Björninn. He returned to SR in 2014 helped them once again to the IHL finals. In game 4 of the finals, Sigurðsson had to be transported by ambulance to a hospital after a hard hit. Without him and Daníel S. Magnússon, who was also injured, SR lost the finals to Skautafélag Akureyrar.

In 2017, Sigurðsson signed with reigning Icelandic champions UMFK Esja. In December 2017, he was named the Icelandic Men's Ice Hockey Player of the Year. For the 2017–18 season, he led the league in goals scored with 33, while coming in second to Jussi Sipponen in points with 61.

Sigurðsson returned to Skautafélag Reykjavíkur for the 2018–19 season. He led the league in points and helped SR to the IHL finals where they lost to Skautafélag Akureyrar.

National team career
Sigurðsson has played for the Icelandic men's national team since 2017.

Coaching career
In 2019, Sigurðsson was hired as an assistant coach at Duquesne University.

Personal life
Sigurðsson is the son of Stefán Örn Sigurðsson, a former member of the Icelandic national football team, and American Laura Sigurðsson.

References

External links

1993 births
Ice hockey players from Pennsylvania
Icelandic ice hockey forwards
Icelandic people of American descent
Living people
People from Mars, Pennsylvania
American men's ice hockey players
Sportspeople from the Pittsburgh metropolitan area
American people of Icelandic descent